"Rock and Roll Preacher" is a single by Slade.

Rock and Roll Preacher, Rock 'n' Roll Preacher, Rock'n Roll Preacher may also refer to:

 Rock 'n Roll Preacher, album by Preacher Jack
 "Rock 'N' Roll Preacher", song by Chuck Girard from the album Chuck Girard
 "The Rock 'n' Roll Preacher", song by Subterranean Masquerade from the album Suspended Animation Dreams
 "Rock 'N Roll Preacher", song by Atlantis and its singer Inga Rumpf